Gergő Jeremiás (born 26 February 1985) is a Hungarian football trainer who currently trainer for Debreceni VSC.

References 

1985 births
Living people
Hungarian footballers
Debreceni VSC players
Association football midfielders